Phil Ortiz an American animator. He has worked for more than 30 years as a professional artist, ranging from daily newspaper comic strips to animated cartoons.

Awards

 1988-2007: Member of the Academy of Television Arts & Sciences (ATAS)
 1995-2007: Member of the National Cartoonists Society (NCS)
 1993-2007: Bongo Comics, Currently, lead pencil animator Simpsons Comics
 1993—94: Disney Store, Concept illustrations for merchandise
 Hanna-Barbera Character art for merchandising Department
 Al White Studios, Character art for Disney merchandise
 1991-93: The Walt Disney Company, Publishing Character artist for various children's books. Comic artist for Disney Adventure Magazine
 1993 Ogilvy & Mather, Storyboard clean-ups for Cocoa & Fruity Pebbles commercials
 1987-90: Warner Bros. Animation, Inking and layout for the Bugs Bunny comic strip for newspaper publication
 1989 Calico Productions Layout and model design for Denver The Dinosaur series
 1989-91: Klasky Csupo, INC. Background design supervisor for The Simpsons TV series 1987—88: FILM ROMAN Layouts and model design for the Garfield Christmas Special, Garfield, The Saturday Morning Series, and Garfield's Nine Lives
 1983—87 Ruby-Spears Productions, Layouts and model design for animation for Alvin And The Chipmunks and other series
 1978—82: Hanna-Barbera, Layouts, model design, animation arid presentation art for animated shows: The Flintstones, The Smurfs, Richie Rich.

Personal life
Ortiz lives in Lake Arrowhead, California. He has appeared at Wizard World and the Los Angeles Times Festival of Books.

References

External links

 
 

Living people
American comics artists
People from Lake Arrowhead, California
Place of birth missing (living people)
Year of birth missing (living people)
American animators